This is a list of the main career statistics of professional tennis player Naomi Osaka. She was the champion of the 2018 US Open, 2019 Australian Open, 2020 US Open, and 2021 Australian Open.

Performance timelines

Only main-draw results in WTA Tour, Grand Slam tournaments, Fed Cup/Billie Jean King Cup and Olympic Games are included in win–loss records.

Singles
Current through the 2022 Toray Pan Pacific Open.

Doubles

Grand Slam finals

Singles: 4 (4 titles)

WTA 1000 finals

Singles: 4 (2 titles, 2 runner–ups)

WTA career finals

Singles: 11 (7 titles, 4 runner–ups)

WTA Challenger finals

Singles: 1 (1 runner-up)

ITF Circuit finals

Singles: 4 (4 runner–ups)

WTA Tour career earnings
Current as of 15 November 2021

Career Grand Slam tournament seedings
The tournaments won by Naomi Osaka are in boldface.

Head-to-head records

Record against top 10 players
Osaka's record against players who have been ranked in the top 10. Active players are in boldface.

No. 1 wins

Top 10 wins
Osaka has a 12–20 (37.5%) W–L record against players who were, at the time the match was played, ranked in the top 10.

Double bagel matches (6–0, 6–0)

National and international representation

Fed Cup: 6 (5–1)

Singles: 6 (5–1)

Longest winning streaks

23 match win streak (2020–21)

Notes

References

External links

 Official website 
 
 
 
 Naomi Osaka – Japan Tennis Association

Osaka, Naomi